Running Man is a 2015 Chinese reality comedy film directed by Hu Jia and Cen Junyi. It was released on January 30, 2015. It is a film adaptation of a Zhejiang Television series Running Man.

Cast
Angelababy
Li Chen
Chen He
Zheng Kai
Wong Cho-lam
Wang Baoqiang
Guo Jingfei
Evonne Hsieh
Lynn Hung
Yi Yi

Box office
As of February 22, 2015, Running Man has grossed around US$70 million in China.

The film topped the box office during its opening weekend in China earning US$31.86 million from 155,940 screenings and 7.28 million admissions ahead of Hollywood blockbuster, The Hobbit: The Battle of the Five Armies which was in its second weekend run. It remained at the summit in its second weekend earning $24.49 million.

References

2015 comedy films
Chinese comedy films
Films based on television series
2010s Mandarin-language films